Joel Cohen (born 1942) is an American musician specializing in early music repertoires. Cohen graduated from Classical High School in Providence, Rhode Island in 1959, and Brown University in 1963. He continued graduate education at Harvard University. From 1968 to 2008, he was the director of the Boston Camerata, a prominent American early music ensemble.  He remains connected to the Boston Camerata as Music Director Emeritus. Cohen founded the Camerata Mediterranea in 1990 and incorporated it as a nonprofit research institute in France in 2007.  He performs, playing the lute and guitar, as well as singing. He is best known as an organizer and creator of concert programs and sound recordings. He has also written extensively on musical topics. In recent years, Cohen's research and performance activities have centered on early American repertoires (including Shaker song), as well as southern European repertoires of the Middle Ages.  Many of his projects in this latter category involve collaboration with Middle Eastern musicians.

He has collaborated very frequently with his wife, French soprano Anne Azéma, the Artistic Director (since 2008) of the Boston Camerata, and has also worked with numerous choirs, including the Schola Cantorum and student choruses at Brown, Brandeis, Harvard and other universities. His professional honors include the Signet Society Medal (Harvard University), the Howard Mayer Brown Award, the Erwin Bodky Award, the Georges Longy Award, the Grand Prix du Disque (France) and the Edison Prize (Netherlands).  He was a government-appointed artist-in-residence in the Netherlands during the year 2000,  and is an Officier de l'Ordre des Arts et des Lettres of the French Republic.

Cohen studied composition with Randall Thompson at Harvard University, and musicology with Gustave Reese, Nino Pirotta, John Ward, and Elliot Forbes, at that same institution.  He was awarded a Danforth Fellowship and spent two years in Paris as a student of Nadia Boulanger.  In the 1970s he spent two seasons as a producer of musical radio programs for the French National Radio (France Musique), where he originated the concept of an all-day musical celebration on the days of the solstice,  an idea later to be adapted as a national celebration each June 21 in France.  This annual event is currently known as the "Fête de la Musique" also known as  "World Music Day".

Work in European early music
Cohen's initial projects in the early music field were in the area of the French and English Renaissance. His enthusiasm for medieval and Renaissance music continues to be reflected in recent projects,  including a series of commissioned programs (2001–2008) for the Gardner Museum,  Boston,  around Italian repertoires of the fifteenth and sixteenth centuries. His forays into baroque repertoire have been more episodic but have attracted widespread comment and attention: the first early-instruments recording of Purcell's "Dido and Aeneas"(Harmonia Mundi, 1980), and a well-received recording of Jean Gilles' "Requiem" (Erato, 1990), among others.  From 1986 forward,  many of his new Eurocentric projects dealt with music of the Middle Ages, including a medieval retelling of the "Tristan and Iseult" legend (Erato, Grand Prix du Disque, 1987).

Work in early American music
Cohen's interest in American vernacular traditions dates from his childhood lessons on folk guitar, and his experience in later student years as a jazz bassist.  He was introduced to southern shapenote tunebooks by his mentor at Harvard University, the composer Randall Thompson, and by Alan Lomax's field recordings of Sacred Harp sings in Alabama in 1942.  Cohen later travelled to the South on several occasions to participate in Sacred Harp sings and conventions.  His first program with the Boston Camerata involving extensive treatment of early American oral and written sources was "The Roots of American Music" (1976), released as an Advent cassette, and later re-recorded (1986) as "New Britain".  The commercial success of this last recording,  released after a lapse of several years by the French label Erato, led Cohen and the Erato label to record a series of early American programs with the Boston Camerata, including "The American Vocalist", "Trav'ling Home", and "Liberty Tree".  For the 1992 celebration of the Columbus year,  the Boston Symphony Orchestra and the Tanglewood Festival invite Cohen and the Camerata to prepare a program of early Hispanic repertoire from the New World.  This project became "Nueva España", recorded by Erato and subsequently one of the Boston Camerata's most requested touring programs.

Cohen, the Boston Camerata, and the Shakers
Informed by Shaker music scholar, Roger Hall, of the Shaker library at Sabbathday Lake, Maine, and its extensive musical holdings, Cohen traveled to that still-functioning  community to do research on Shaker manuscript sources.  He and his wife, soprano Anne Azéma, also began an enduring personal relationship with the members of the community,  who agreed to record and perform their music in the company of the Boston Camerata and collaborating choirs.  Two CDs of Shaker song  (Simple Gifts and The Golden Harvest) commemorate these collaborations, which continued for several seasons from 1992 forward.

In 2004 Cohen and the Finnish choreographer Tero Saarinen created a dance piece, "Borrowed Light", using live Shaker music.  This production has toured extensively in France, Germany,  England, Sweden, Finland, Italy, New Zealand, the Netherlands, Australia, and the United States, most recently at the Jacob's Pillow Dance Festival (Becket, Ma.) in 2012 and the Palais de Chaillot (Paris) in 2014. Cohen co-directed and edited the music for "A Chair fit for an Angel" (2014) a Canadian documentary film, winner of several awards, built around Shaker and Shaker-related arts.

Intercultural musical activities

Cohen's interest in cross-cultural and intercultural musical encounters has led to projects exploring early African and Amerindian contributions to New World music ("Nueva España",  cited above),  and to several endeavors with Middle Eastern/Near Eastern artists.

As early as 1982, Joel and the Boston Camerata had developed a program called "The Sacred Bridge," exploring Jewish and Christian interactions during the Middle Ages. In 1988 Erato Disques decided to make a recording of this program. Still in demand after more than two decades, the recording has been reissued on Warner Classics.

The "Sacred Bridge" program continues to tour internationally. Since its inception it has undergone considerable development, and now includes an important Arabic/Muslim component. Recent performances have been undertaken with the U.S.- based Sharq Arabic Music Ensemble

In 1997 Joel Cohen met the eminent Moroccan musician Mohammed Briouel for the first time. Their encounter gave birth to a major production, a selection of the thirteenth century Cantigas of King Alfonso el Sabio with European and Moroccan musicians collaborating. The recording, made in Fez, Morocco, was signed "Camerata Mediterranea," and included the participation of the Abdelkrim Rais orchestra of Fez, directed by Mr. Briouel.

The Cantigas recording won the coveted Edison Prize in 2000, and has toured extensively in the United States, Morocco, Germany, the Netherlands, and France.

"A Mediterranean Christmas", with the Boston Camerata and the Sharq Ensemble, is Cohen's most recent production exploring shared roots and musical practices. Recorded in 2005 for Warner Classics, and enthusiastically greeted by the musical press, the production has also toured live in the United States and France.

In recent seasons Joel Cohen has also undertaken collaborations with Dünya, a Turkish music ensemble, and its leader, Mehmet Ali Sanlıkol. With Camerata Mediterranea, he produced a colloquium in early summer 2009 around the subject of cross-cultural Mediterranean musical interactions, in the French village of Saint-Guilhem-le-Désert.

Discography

With the Boston Camerata 
 The American Vocalist
 Trav'ling Home: American Spirituals, 1770-1870
 The Liberty Tree: American Music 1776-1861
 Carmina Burana
 Musique Judeo-Baroque
 Nueva España
 The Sacred Bridge: Jews and Christians in Medieval Europe
 Simple Gifts: Shaker Chants and Spirituals
 The Golden Harvest: More Shaker Chants and Spirituals
 New Britain: The Roots of American Folksong
 What Then Is Love?
 Gilles' Requiem
 Pierre Certon: Chansons & Messe "Sus Le Pont d'Avignon"
 A Medieval Christmas
 Noel, Noel: French Christmas Music 1200-1600
 A Baroque Christmas
 A Renaissance Christmas
 A Mediterranean Christmas
 An American Christmas: carols, hymns and spirituals, 1770-1870
 Sing We Noel: Christmas Music from England and Early America

With the Camerata Mediterranea
 Bernart de Ventadorn: Le Fou sur le Pont
 Lo Gai Saber
 Cantigas of Alfonso el Sabio with the Abdelkrim Rais Ensemble of Fez,  Morocco (Edison Prize, 2000)

External links
 more complete discography
 Camerata Mediterranea Institute Wikipedia Page
 Camerata Mediterranea Institute Website
 Music of the Shakers

1942 births
Culture of Boston
Harvard University alumni
Living people
American performers of early music
Musicians from Boston
Place of birth missing (living people)
Classical musicians from Massachusetts
Classical High School alumni